Ulick de Burgh Browne, 7th Marquess of Sligo  (30 March 1898 – 7 January 1941) was a British and Irish peer and British army officer. He served in the cavalry regiment the Royal Scots Greys during World War I. He was known as the Earl of Altamont until his father's death.

He was the son of George Browne, 6th Marquess of Sligo and Agatha Stewart Hodgson.

He died childless at the age of 42 in a Dublin nursing home, and was succeeded by his uncle, Arthur Howe Browne. He left an estate valued at £300,845.

References

1898 births
1941 deaths
British Army personnel of World War I
Royal Scots Greys officers
Ulick
Ulick
Recipients of the Military Cross